Malawi competed in the Olympic Games for the first time at the 1972 Summer Olympics in Munich, West Germany. 16 competitors, 13 men and 3 women, took part in 17 events in 3 sports.

Athletics

Men's 100 metres
Mustaff Matola
 First Heat — 11.31s (→ did not advance, 84th place)

Men's 800 metres
Harry Nkopeka
 Heat — 1:57.7 (→ did not advance, 55th place)

Men's 1500 metres
Harry Nkopeka
 Heat — 4:00.9 (→ did not advance, 61st place)

Men's High Jump
Daniel Mkandawire
 Qualification Round — 1.90m (→ did not advance, 38th place out of 43)

Men's Decathlon
Wilfred Ngwenya-Mwalwanda
 6,154 pts

Women's 200 metres
Mabel Saeluzika
 Heat — 28.29s (→ did not advance)

Women's 400 metres
Emesia Chizunga
 Heat — 58.86s (→ did not advance)

Boxing

Men

Cycling

Two cyclists represented Malawi in 1972.

Individual road race
 Grimon Langson — did not finish (→ no ranking)
 Raphael Kazembe — did not finish (→ no ranking)

References

External links
Official Olympic Reports

Nations at the 1972 Summer Olympics
1972
1972 in Malawi